The European Future and Emerging Technologies (FET) Flagship projects include the Graphene Flagship, Human Brain Project, the Blue Brain Project, and the Quantum technology Flagship.

Other major projects proposed as part of the Future and Emerging Technologies competition include the Living Earth Simulator Project.  European Future and Emerging Technologies Flagship projects are funded through Horizon 2020. In August 2018, European Commission funds $3.5 Million to FET.

References

Emerging technologies